The 1969 NCAA Men's Water Polo Championship was the first annual NCAA Men's Water Polo Championship to determine the national championship of NCAA men's college water polo. Tournament matches were played at Belmont Plaza Pool in Long Beach, California during December 1969.

UCLA defeated California in the final, 5–2, to win their first championship.

The leading scorer for the tournament was Ben Gage, from UC Santa Barbara, with 14 goals. The awards for All-Tournament Team and Most Outstanding Player were given out until 1972.

Qualification
Since there has only been one single national championship for water polo, all NCAA men's water polo programs (whether from Division I, Division II, or Division III) were eligible. A total of 8 teams were invited to contest this championship.

Bracket
Site: Belmont Plaza Pool, Long Beach, California

See also 
 NCAA Men's Water Polo Championship

References

NCAA Men's Water Polo Championship
NCAA Men's Water Polo Championship
1969 in sports in California
December 1969 sports events in the United States
1969